(March 15, 1946 – November 22, 2000) was a professional wrestler and a former ring announcer, known for his tenure in All Japan Pro Wrestling. He was the son of wrestler Rikidozan and the older brother of Mitsuo Momota.

Career
On October 21, 1972, Momota, along with Shohei "Giant" Baba and younger brother Mitsuo Momota, founded All Japan Pro Wrestling where he started out as a ring announcer for the promotion. Around the mid-1970s, Momota decided to become a wrestler just like his father and his brother. He started training with Terry Funk and Dory Funk Jr. and began wrestling in Texas before wrestling full-time for All Japan. His wrestling career didn't take off as well as planned although he did find a little success. In 1987 he retired from in-ring competition and decided to become a backstage helper and a member of the All Japan board of directors until he resigned from his position after Mitsuharu Misawa had disagreements with widow Motoko Baba. He joined Pro Wrestling Noah as a backstage helper and a member of the board of directors, but in September 2000, his health was beginning to deteriorate due to liver failure.

Family
Momota was the son of Rikidozan, a wrestling legend who is known as the "Father of Puroresu". He also had a younger brother Mitsuo Momota. His nephew is named Chikara and made his professional wrestling debut in 2013.

Death
On November 22, 2000, Momota died of liver failure. He was 54 years old.

Championships and accomplishments
All Japan Pro Wrestling
11-Man Battle Royal winner (1979)

Tokyo Sports
Service Award (2001)

References

External links
 Yoshihiro Momota's profile

1946 births
2000 deaths
Sportspeople from Kyoto
Professional wrestling announcers
Japanese male professional wrestlers
Japanese people of Korean descent